The Hawthorn House was a historic house in Mobile, Alabama, United States.  The -story wood-frame structure, on a brick foundation, was built in 1853 in the Gulf Coast Cottage style by Joshua K. Hawthorn.  It was placed on the National Register of Historic Places on May 21, 1984, based on its architectural significance.  The house was demolished in October 2021.

References

National Register of Historic Places in Mobile, Alabama
Houses on the National Register of Historic Places in Alabama
Houses in Mobile, Alabama
Houses completed in 1853
Gulf Coast cottage architecture in Alabama
Buildings and structures demolished in 2021
Demolished buildings and structures in Alabama